Tricking is a training discipline that combines kicks with flips and twists from martial arts and gymnastics as well as many dance moves and styles from breakdancing. It is a martial art that borrows techniques from taekwondo, wushu, capoeira, and more. It aims to achieve an aesthetic display of different combinations of "tricks". Tricking practitioners are commonly referred to as trickers. Examples of tricking techniques include the 540 kick, the corkscrew (cork), the flashkick, the butterfly twist and the double leg.

History
A tendency to exhibit techniques that are more flashy and complex was observed in martial arts during the period following the 1960s, predating the current tricking movement. Especially in taekwondo, an increasing emphasis on spectacular spinning, jumping or flying kicks developed during the mid-1960s with the introduction of international competitions.

The actual sport of tricking is an internet phenomenon, emerging in the early 2000s. It was emerged ny a person named Ichiro Williams who decided to take his martial art skills to a different level.  Xtreme Martial Arts is thought to be a close precursor to the sport, being shown at various martial arts tournaments in the 90s and early 2000s. By late 2003, the online tricking community was well-developed, bringing trickers from across the globe together. With the rise of YouTube, trickers were able to share their videos with others, and the discipline experienced a massive rise in popularity and interest.

Progression

Unlike many established sports, tricking has no formal rules or regulations, and there are no governing bodies that regulate the sport. Strictly speaking, participants are free to perform any kind of dramatic maneuver and call it a 'trick' - though there are certain moves that are generally accepted as tricking moves. Some practitioners (especially those who discover tricking through the Internet) tend to learn the easier moves first (such as the 540 kick, aerial, kip-up, and backflip) and try to progress through a list of recognized tricks in the perceived order of difficulty. However, how difficult a trick is, varies from person to person; certain tricks may be inexplicably easier or harder than normal for a particular tricker to learn.

Trickers can be divided into different categories of style: some prefer performing mainly martial arts tricks (which almost always incorporate kicks into a trick), others mostly freestyle gymnastics and flips (mainly focus on combining different types of rotations and twists), but most trickers combine moves from both of the disciplines. Trickers regularly train their bodies hard to be able to perform their tricks at any time consistently.

See also
Parkour
Freerunning

References

Gymnastics
Martial art techniques
Parkour techniques